As a service (AAS) is a business model in which something is being presented to a customer, either internal or external, as a service. As-a-Service offerings provide endpoints for customers/consumers to interface with which are usually API driven, but can commonly be controlled via a web console in a user's web browser. The term XaaS can mean "anything as a service".

Internally these often complex systems generally possess a high degree of internal automation which generally provide varying levels of fault tolerance and resiliency, the ability to scale up/down in or out to meet capacity and performance requirements of the workloads submitted to the service by its users/consumers, and are usually intended to operate their day to day functions without the need for human intervention.  IaaS (Infrastructure as a service) features most commonly included in this automation package are compute, storage, network, telemetry, and logging/accountability features, but most IaaS components owe some portion of their workload to these services. The current cloud computing ecosystem contains multiple cloud providers, each with their own menu of these services for their customers to consume on-demand or in some cases even with pre-scoped capacity agreements.

AAS services have the following features:
They are based on open source projects with little to no licensing costs 
Require little to no human intervention to perform their tasks/roles 
Could be scaled up or down depending on level / volume needed 
Maintained and supported internally by the cloud provider 
Use resources that are expendable for reuse by other IaaS tasks and services 

Using AAS services can offer a large cost savings   over traditional vendor-provided infrastructure and server based equivalencies. When deciding on XaaS, one has to consider vendor-specific lock-in features which can be more limited than other similar open source projects.

Examples

Legitimate business models

Criminal business models

Defunct business models

See also
  Cloud computing#Service models

Notes

References